Solo Whist, sometimes known as English Solo or simply Solo, is a trick-taking card game for four players. Despite the name it is not related to Whist, but derives from an early form of Boston played in the Low Countries, whose direct ancestor, in turn, was the 17th-century Spanish game of Ombre. Its major distinctive feature is that one player often plays against the other three. However, players form temporary alliances with two players playing against the other two if "Prop and Cop" is the current bid. It requires four players using a standard 52 card deck with no jokers. Aces are high and the deal, bidding and play are clockwise.

History
Solo Whist was first played in the Low Countries in the first half of the 19th century and in England somewhere about the year 1852 by a family of Dutch Jews. It was practically unknown outside Jewish circles until the end of the 1860s. From 1870 and 1872 it began to be played in the London sporting clubs in an attempt to supplant the card games formerly in vogue.

Solo Whist derives from an early variety of Boston Whist through a Flemish form of the game called "Ghent Whist"  and became popular in Britain as a relaxation from the rigours of partnership. In the event, it remains an essentially informal game of home and pub, and is played for the interest of small stakes rather than for the more arcane pleasures of ingenious coups and complex scores.

Solo whist may have failed to attract the attention that it deserved because it did not develop a scoring system of comparable refinement, and were it not for the phenomenal expansion of Bridge, Solo might have developed further and occupied the social position now claimed by Contract. The game is now mainly played in Britain, Australia and New Zealand, and also especially popular within the Jewish community.

Dealing
The cards are shuffled by the dealer and cut by the player to dealer's right. They can be dealt in ones but it is common practice to deal the cards in groups of three and then a single card for the last round (3,3,3,3,1). The last card is turned face up to indicate the trump suit for that game. The exposed card is part of the dealer's hand and he can pick it up once everyone has noted it. The turn to deal passes to the left after each hand.

A common alternative is to deal with a " rotating 4 " as follows : 4,3,3,3 3,4,3,3 3,3,4,3 3,3,3,4 which has the advantage of concluding with 4 to the dealer to confirm a correctly dealt hand . 

Trumps may also decided by a pre- determined sequence, usually H,C,D,S - and so differing from bridge . 

In some variations the cards are not shuffled after every game, this creates the possibility of a hand having several cards of the same suit making Solo and Abundance hands much more likely.

Bidding
Beginning with the player to dealer's left, each competitor may make one of the bids in the table below or pass. If someone bids, then subsequent players can either pass or bid higher. The bidding continues around the table as many times as necessary until the contract is settled. If everyone passes or there is a Prop without a Cop then the hands are thrown in and dealt again.

Play
The player to the dealer's left leads the first trick, except in the case of an Abundance Declared in which case the bidder leads. Any card may be led and the other three players must follow suit where possible. A player with no card of the led suit may play a trump. If any trumps are played, then the trick is won by the highest trump card. If there are no trumps, it is won by the highest card in the suit that was led. The winner of the trick gets to lead to the next. Once a player has succeeded or failed in their bid, scores are adjusted. The deal then passes to the left and the next hand begins.

Variations

Morris Fagelson 

A common version of Solo played among the Jewish community in Essex and East London show the following differences:

A Prop and Cop pairing need to win seven tricks. Players only get one bid, except the person to the dealer's left who is able to bid twice, although, if someone Props without a Cop, they still have the option to upgrade to a Solo no matter where they sit. The Proposer picks the trump in an Abundance Declared hand.

Straight Solo
In this variation, Prop and Cop is eliminated and only individual hands are allowed.

High-scoring Solo
To increase the proportion of hands with uneven distributions, some play that the cards are shuffled only at the start of a session and after a bid of abundance or higher, while others play that the cards are never reshuffled after the opening deal.  The cards are simply gathered together by the new dealer and the player to the dealer's right cuts.  One variant allows for a -1 penalty for any player who reflexively shuffles the cards.

Different Trumps
Instead of turning the dealer's last dealt card for trump, some cut a card from a second pack. Others go through the trump suits in cyclic order: hearts, clubs, diamonds, spades, hearts, etc. Some even add 'no trumps' into that cycle.

Grand Slam Solo
Uses rules for the Straight Solo and High-scoring Solo above, as well as the cyclical trump order described in "Different Trumps" above.  Additionally, the "Abundance Declared" is replaced with two bids:  A Petit Slam and a Grand Slam.  The Petit Slam requires the bidder to make 12 tricks, and is scored above a Royal Abundance but below a Misère Ouverte.  The Grand Slam, like an Abundance Declared, requires the bidder to make all 13 tricks, and ranks above all other bids.   Both the Petit and Grand Slam bids allow the declarer to choose the trump suit.

Overtricks
To spice up the game further, some play with a payment for overtricks in Prop and Cop, Solo and Abundance. In that case it is usual to set the basic score for a solo as four, five or six units, increasing the other scores in proportion. Each overtrick or undertrick in a Prop and Cop or Solo is worth an extra unit. In Abundance, overtricks gain an extra two units each, but undertricks cost only one unit each. There is no score for over or undertricks in Misère, Misère Ouverte or Abundance Declared.

Irish Solo
There are two phases of the game, the bidding and the play. During bidding players try and win the bid by claiming to be able to win more tricks than the previous player claimed. There are no things such as those mentioned above like "Prop & Cop" etc., nor are there various points, it is just straight bidding similar to Bridge. For example, a player who calls "six spades" will try to win six tricks with spades as trumps, but be outbid if another player calls "seven hearts." The one who wins the bidding round is the one who goes "solo" in the play phase. The solo player is playing against the other three players. The goal is to win what he said he could win, the goal of the other three is to stop him.

If there is betting each trick is given a certain value and the pot is given by the number of tricks that were bid.
If the solo player gets the bid he/she wins the pot, if the other three stop him/her from achieving it they split the pot between them.
If there is a player short then, before bidding, that hand is laid open on the table and whoever wins the bidding places it opposite their seat and plays from it after the player following them has played a card.

Obs: A bid of Misère claims to be able to lose all 13 tricks, its value is equivalent to attempting to win 12 tricks.  The suit order and no trumps have the same status order as in Bridge.

In literature
In Robert W Service's poem "The Shooting of Dan McGrew", Dan McGrew is playing Solo in the back of the bar.  His bid is "Spread Misère". Presumably that is the same bid as Misère Ouverte.

Trivia
The words "Misère", "Ouverte", "Grand", and "Petit" are French and mean misery, open, large, and small, respectively. The hands Royal Abundance and Abundance Declared are also known as Abundance Royale and Abundance Declaree; Abundance is sometimes nicknamed Bundle.

See also
Skat
Ombre
Boston
Euchre
Bridge

Footnotes

References

Bibliography 
 "Bird's Eye" (1881). Solo Whist. Manchester: John Heywood.
 _ (1883). The Rules of Solo Whist: Derived from the Best Authorities. Melbourne: Samuel Mullen.
 Ander, Tim (2018). How to Play Whist. 
 
 Hoffmann, Professor (1891). "Solo Whist" in The Cyclopædia of Card and Table Games. London: George Routledge. pp. 218–239.
 Wilks, Abraham S. (1894). "Solo Whist and its Rules" in The Whist Table, ed. by "Portland". NY: Charles Scribner's Sons. pp. 401–466.
 Wilks, Abraham S. (1898). The Handbook of Solo Whist. NY: Brentano.
 Wilks, Abraham S. and G. F. Pardon (c. 1888). How to Play Solo Whist. NY: Scribner & Welford's.

External links
The Rules of Solo at pagat.com

19th-century card games
Solo card games
Boston group
English card games